Marzuk Russell (born 15 August 1973) is a Bangladeshi poet, model, and actor. He made his television debut by TV play Ayna Mohol was directed by Mostofa Sarwar Farooki. He got mainstream acclaim after the self-titled role in the film Bachelor in 2004. Since then he acted in many television drama and worked for numerous television commercials. Marzuk also appeared on several music videos, such as Ghuri Tumi Kar Akashe Oro (2012), Smrity Katha (2017) etc.

Early life
Marzuk Russell was born on 15 August 1973 in his mother's village Gopalganj District, Bangladesh. He grew up in Daulatpur, Khulna. His father worked on a Jute Mill in Gopalganj. He started going to school in Govt. Krishnamohan Primary School, but then he was sent to class six on a madrasa by his father. At the madrasa he was suffering from class discrimination.

In 1993 he moved to Dhaka.

Acting
In the early 2000s, Marzuk started acting through video-fiction Aynamohol directed by Mostofa Sarwar Farooki. Later years he has continued his work collaboration with Farooki.

Literature
Marzuk started writing poems while studying in the eighth grade of Madrasa. His first poem was published in "Janabarta", a local magazine from Khulna. Then gradually started freelance writing in different newspapers and magazines. His first published poetry titled was Shanting Chara Songjog Nishidhwa. Then he wrote three poetry respectively, Chander Budir Boyosh Jokhon Sholo (2003), Bainji Bari Road and Chotto Kothay Tennis Ball. "Alternative" is one of the most popular poetry of his creation.

Bibliography

Filmography

As lyricist

Television

Web series

Discography

 Ha Do Do performed by James
 Vashbo Je Jole (Prem Jomunar Kule) performed by James
 Lolona performed by Ayub Bachchu
 Tomar Cokhe Dekhle performed by Ayub Bachchu
 Baundule performed by Asif Akbar (2016)
 Mil performed by Asif Akbar
 Myth performed by Asif Akbar
 Jolkonna performed by Asif Akbar
 Foo (2018) performed by Asif Akbar
 Purte Chaile
 Bhab Sutra (2019) performed by Ayub Bachchu

References

External links

Living people
21st-century Bengali poets
21st-century Bangladeshi male actors
Bengali-language poets
Bengali male poets
Bengali-language lyricists
Bangladeshi lyricists
Bengali models
Bangladeshi male models
Bangladeshi male television actors
Bangladeshi male film actors
Male actors in Bengali cinema
1973 births